Ardah ( / ALA-LC: al-‘arḍah) is a type of folkloric group dance in  Saudi Arabia. The dance is performed with two rows of men opposite of one another, each of whom may or may not be wielding a sword or cane, and is accompanied by drums and spoken poetry.

Originally, the "ardah" was performed only by males of tribes of the Arabian Peninsula before going to war, but nowadays it is done at celebrations, weddings, and national and cultural events by males of all tribes, such as the Jenadriyah festival.

It was inscribed on UNESCO's Intangible Cultural Heritage of Humanity in 2015 as Alardah Alnajdiyah.

Variations

The term 'ardah' (عَرْضَة) is thought to derive from the Arabic verb ard (عَرَضَ) meaning 'to show' or 'to parade'. It was so named because its purpose was to publicly display the fighting strength of a tribe and boost morale before an armed engagement. Although there are regional variations of the particular rendition of ardah, the purpose it serves is nearly identical throughout the Arabian Peninsula.

Saudi ardah
Najdi ardah is the most common variant of ardah in Saudi Arabia. It is also the most practiced and highly televised male folkloric dance in the entire country. The Saudi government changed its name to 'Saudi ardah' in the 21st century. However, there are numerous variations of ardah distinct from Najdi ardah throughout the country, notably in the regions of Najran, Asir and Jizan.

See also
 Middle Eastern dance
 Mizmar
 Yowlah

References

External links
 Ardah, Conference on Music in the Islamic World/Urkevich

Arab dance
Group dances
Middle Eastern dances
Arab culture
Saudi Arabian culture
Dance in Saudi Arabia
Dance in the United Arab Emirates
Dance in Bahrain
Dance in Qatar